Lina is a female given name, surname and nickname.
 
Lina may also refer to:
468 Lina, a main belt asteroid that was named after the family housemaid of the discoverer
LINA (software), enables users to run applications compiled for Linux under Windows and Mac OS X
 Linear A, an ancient writing system with ISO 15924 code Lina
 Lina (American singer), American R&B singer
 Lina (South Korean singer), South Korean singer
Lina gård Swedish estate
 Liga Nacional de Fútbol Profesional de Honduras, premier Honduran association football league

See also

Li Na (disambiguation), name of some Chinese people
Linna (disambiguation)
St. Lina
POI v Lina
Lina's sunbird
Enantia lina
Apa Lină